Miss World 2007, the 57th edition of the Miss World pageant, was held on 1 December 2007 at the Crown of Beauty Theatre in Sanya, China. It was hosted by Fernando Allende and Angela Chow. Zhang Zilin of China won the crown and succeeded Taťána Kuchařová of the Czech Republic.

The 106 contestants recorded the official torch relay anthem Light the Passion, Share the Dream for the 2008 Olympic Games as a major co-operation between the Beijing Olympic Committee and Miss World Limited. The song had its first broadcast to a global audience at the 57th Miss World final on 1 December.

In addition, to coincide with World AIDS Day, the pageant presented a special tribute to the fight against AIDS, with a televised speech from former South African President Nelson Mandela and the presence of his daughter and grandson, along with traditional dancers from South Africa who joined the contestants in a special song.

Results

Placements

Continental Queens of Beauty

Contestants
106 contestants competed for the title.

Judges 
 Julia Morley (UK) – Chairman of the Miss World Organization
 Duncan James (UK) – Member of the boy band Blue, now an actor and TV presenter
 Annabel Croft (UK) – Former tennis star and television presenter
 Ben de Lisi (Italy) – Renowned fashion designer
 Li Xiao Bai (China) – managing director of New Silk Road Modelling Agency
 Bruce Zhao (China) – Chairperson of the Huayu Group
 Makaziwe Mandela (South Africa) – Daughter of Nelson Mandela, industrialist and philanthropist 
 Neal Hamil (United States) – managing director of Elite Models
 Krish Naidoo (Ireland) – Miss World International Ambassador, entrepreneur, works with many charitable organisations
 Elena Franchuk (Ukraine) – Founder of the Anti-AIDS Foundation of Ukraine

Notes

Returns

Last competed in 1981:
 
Last competed in 1988:
 
Last competed in 1996:
 
Last competed in 2003:
 
Last competed in 2004:
 
 
Last competed in 2005:

Replacements
  – The Miss & Mister Albania organisation replaced Egla Harxhi, Miss Albania 2007, with Elda Dushi, for unknown reasons.
  – Miss Belarus 2006 1st Runner-up, Yulia Sindzeyeva, was supposed to compete in Miss World; however, she attended the Miss International contest in Japan, where she became 2nd runner-up. A contract with the Japanese organisation prevents her from attending the Miss World contest. 2nd runner-up, Alena Aladka, took her place.
  – Lisaika Everitz, Miss World Curaçao, was not accepted as Curaçao's entry to Miss World 2007 for not meeting the age requirements. She was replaced with Naemi Monte. Since Monte did not turn in the official application to the national organisation before the deadline established by Miss World Ltd, the franchiseholder appointed a new delegate: Mckeyla Richards. After this action, Naemi Monte decided to file a lawsuit against the franchiseholder, Reprod, to regain the right to represent the island at the international pageant. On 17 October, a jury decided in favour of Reprod, ending the dispute between both.
  – Ina Avlasēviča, Miss Latvia 2006, competed in Miss World 2008. The organisation sent Kristīne Djadenko, a former Miss Latvia, to that year's pageant.
  – Miss Sea 2007 as well as Miss Vietnam World 2007's 2nd Runner-up Đặng Minh Thu was named by Elite Vietnam as the country's candidate at Miss World 2007. They Earlier offered Miss World's ticket to Miss Vietnam World 2007 Ngô Phương Lan, who turned it down to focus on her studies in Switzerland and Teresa Sam, 1st Runner-up.

Withdrawals
   – Esonica Veira She participated 4 years later at Miss World 2011, where she became Top 15 
  – Natalie Griffith
  – Leilani Stevens - Financial problems. 
  – Yen Chin Li
  – Hannah McLaughlin
  – Peth Msinska
  – Amanda Ammann. She competed in Miss Universe 2008 and was unplaced. Apparently the Miss Switzerland organization gave up their Miss World licence that year.

No shows
 
 
  – Pupuce Ngalla Ibata, national director of Miss Congo (COMICO) was informed that Congo will not take part in Miss World 2007. The reason being because the Miss World Organization never replied to their application for the franchise. However, she will try to get the franchise next year.
 
 
 
  – The Miss Liberia 2007/2008 is scheduled for 23 November 2007, just one week before the Miss World 2007 finals takes place.
 
 
  – Yasmin Walcott, national director of Miss Saint Lucia World, was informed that the island won't be represented in Miss World 2007.
  – Fabiana Arnell, national director of Sint Maarten Queen's competition has informed that reports about Shanyra Richardson's participation in Miss World are not true, but she is interested in taking part in future Miss World competitions.

References

External links
 Pageantopolis – Miss World 2007

Miss World
2007 in China
2007 beauty pageants
Beauty pageants in China
December 2007 events in China